Joseph Chappelle is an American screenwriter, producer, and director of film and television. He is perhaps best known for his work on the critically acclaimed HBO series The Wire, where he directed six episodes and served as co-executive producer for three seasons. In 2018, his episode "Middle Ground" was named the 6th Best TV Episode of the Century by pop culture website The Ringer. He has also produced and directed several other popular cable television programs, including CSI: Miami, Fringe and Chicago Fire.

Chappelle wrote and directed the political thriller An Acceptable Loss, starring Tika Sumpter and Jamie Lee Curtis, which was released by IFC Films in January 2019.

Career
Chappelle graduated from Northwestern University with a Master of Fine Arts in Film and worked in Chicago's advertising community before working in film and television.

1990s
Chappelle began his career with the independently produced film Thieves Quartet in 1994. He wrote and directed the feature. He went on to direct the horror sequel Halloween: The Curse of Michael Myers (1995) and shot additional scenes for Hellraiser: Bloodline (1996), replacing Kevin Yagher due to his fallout with the studio over creative differences. He directed the thriller Phantoms in 1998, based on the Dean Koontz novel of the same name.

2000s
Chappelle directed the film Takedown in 2000. Also in 2000 Chappelle made his television debut with the feature Dark Prince: The True Story of Dracula.

In 2001, Chappelle became a director for the first season of espionage drama The Agency. Chappelle directed the episodes ""Viva Fidel", "God's Work" and "The Year of Living Dangerously". Chappelle did not return to work on the series' second season.

Later, in 2001, he became a director for the short-lived werewolf drama Wolf Lake. He directed the first season episodes "Soup to Nuts" and "Legend of Lost Lenore".

In 2002, Chappelle directed the second season premiere "Emergence" for the series Witchblade. He also directed the direct-to-video thriller sequel The Skulls II in 2002.

In 2002, Chappelle became a director for three new series; the 2002 reimagining of The Twilight Zone, HBO crime drama The Wire and the procedural spin-off CSI: Miami. He helmed The Twilight Zone episodes "Upgrade" and "To Protect and Serve". Chappelle remained involved with The Wire as a co-executive producer and with CSI: Miami as a producer throughout the 2000s.

In 2005, Chappelle served as a consultant and director for new CBS drama CSI: NY. The series was the second spin-off from CSI: Crime Scene Investigation. Chappelle directed the first season episode "Supply and Demand".

The Wire
Chappelle joined the crew of the HBO crime drama The Wire as a director for the first season in 2002. The Wire was created by David Simon and examines the city of Baltimore one faltering institution at a time. Chappelle directed the first season episode "One Arrest".

Chappelle returned to The Wire as co-executive producer, episodic director and second unit director for the third season in 2004. Chappelle directed the season's penultimate episode "Middle Ground". "Middle Ground" received the show's only Emmy Award nomination to date, for writers Simon and George Pelecanos in the category Outstanding Writing for a Drama Series. Simon credits Chappelle with choosing the music for the season three closing montage; Solomon Burke's cover of Van Morrison's "Fast Train" which appeared in the season finale "Mission Accomplished".

Chappelle returned as a co-executive producer, episodic director and second unit director for the fourth season of The Wire in 2006. He directed the season premiere "Boys of Summer" and the penultimate episode "That's Got His Own".

Chappelle returned as a co-executive producer and director for the fifth and final season of The Wire in 2008. Chappelle directed the season premiere "More with Less" and the penultimate episode "Late Editions". The series ended after five seasons. Chappelle and Ernest Dickerson were the series most prolific directors having helmed six episodes each. Chappelle and the other senior producers were nominated for a BAFTA Award for Best International Series at the 2009 ceremony for their work on the fifth season.

CSI: Miami
Chappelle directed the pilot episode "Golden Parachute" for the CBS crime drama CSI: Miami. The series was a spin-off from the successful procedural CSI: Crime Scene Investigation. Chappelle became a producer and director for the first season once the series was picked up. Chappelle directed a further four episodes for the first season; "Losing Face", "Evidence of Things Unseen", "Double Cap" and the season finale "Body Count".

Chappelle remained a producer and director for the second season of CSI: Miami in 2003. He directed a further six episodes; "Dead Zone", "Hurricane Anthony", "Big Brother", "Slow Burn", "Not Landing" and the season finale "Innocent".

While working on the third season of The Wire Chappelle reduced his involvement with CSI: Miami. He was no longer a producer but remained an episodic director for the third season in 2005. He directed the episodes "Recoil" and "10-7".

Chappelle did not work on the fourth season of CSI: Miami as he was working on the fourth season of The Wire. He returned as a 
consulting producer and director for the fifth season in fall 2006. He directed the season premiere "Rio" and the episodes "Curse of the Coffin", "Come As You Are" and "Throwing Heat". Chappelle again scaled back his involvement for the sixth season in fall 2007; he returned to being an episodic director only. He directed the episodes "Stand Your Ground" and "All In".

Chappelle returned to CSI: Miami as a consulting producer and director for the seventh season in fall 2008. He directed a further six episodes for the season; the premiere "Resurrection", "Wrecking Crew", "Power Trip", "Smoke Gets in Your CSI's", "Flight Risk" and the finale "Seeing Red".

Chappelle left the CSI: Miami production staff to work on the series Fringe in 2009. Chappelle continued to work as an episodic director for CSI: Miami while working on Fringe. He helmed the eighth season finale "All Fall Down" in 2010.

Fringe
In fall 2009, Chappelle joined the crew of the science-fiction/crime drama Fringe as a co-executive producer and director for the second and third season. Afterwards, in its fourth season, Chappelle served as an executive producer. The series follows a team of FBI agents and scientists investigating Fringe phenomena.

Chicago Fire
In winter 2012–2013, Chappelle joined the crew of the crime drama Chicago Fire as executive producer, and in five episodes as director.

An Acceptable Loss
In May 2017, Chappelle left Chicago Fire to begin production on his independent film An Acceptable Loss (formerly The Pages). The film, a political thriller starring Tika Sumpter and Jamie Lee Curtis, marked Chappelle's return to feature filmmaking after over 15 years of working in television.

An Acceptable Loss was acquired by IFC Films in September 2018 with plans for a January 2019 theatrical release.

Personal life
Chappelle grew up in northern New Jersey.

Filmography

Television

Production staff

Director

Film
Thieves Quartet (1994)
Halloween: The Curse of Michael Myers (1995)
Hellraiser: Bloodline (1996) (Additional photography, uncredited)
Phantoms (1998)
Track Down (2000)
The Skulls II (2002)
An Acceptable Loss (2019)

References

External links

20th-century births
American film directors
American television directors
American television producers
Year of birth missing (living people)
Living people
Northwestern University School of Communication alumni